The Ball State Cardinals football team is a college football program representing  Ball State University in National Collegiate Athletic Association (NCAA) Division I Football Bowl Subdivision (FBS) college football. Mike Neu is the head coach. Ball State plays its home games on Scheumann Stadium on the campus of Ball State University in Muncie, Indiana. The Cardinals compete in the Mid-American Conference as a member of the West Division.

The Cardinals have a 421–381–32 record, which ranks below the top 50 most victories among NCAA FBS programs. Ball State was originally classified as a teacher's college, participating in the National Junior College Athletic Association (NJCAA) from 1937 until 1956. In 1957, they were classified as a Small College school until 1972. Ball State received Division II classification in 1973, before becoming a Division I-AA program in 1975 and a Division I-A (now FBS) program in 1981, dropping to Division I-AA for a single season (1982) before returning to Division I-A.

Conference affiliations
Ball State has been an independent and affiliated with multiple conferences.
 Independent (1924–1949)
 Indiana Collegiate Conference (1950–1969)
 Conference of Midwestern Universities (1970–1971)
 Mid-American Conference (1973–present)

Championships

Conference championships

Division championships

Bowl games
Ball State has appeared in nine NCAA Division I postseason bowl games, in which they have compiled a 1–8 record. Within all FBS teams, Ball State was one of eight that had never won a sanctioned bowl game, until the 2020 Arizona Bowl.

Ball State also appeared in two NCAA College Division postseason bowl games, where they compiled a record of 0–1–1.

Head coaches

The Ball State Cardinals have had 17 head coaches throughout the program's history. With 68 victories, John Magnabosco has the most victories in the program's history, followed by Paul Schudel (60 wins) and Dave McClain (46).

Rivalries

Indiana State

Ball State leads the series with Indiana State 38–24–1 with the last game played in 2014.

Miami (OH)

Ball State and Miami were granted rivalry status by the MAC in 2017. The cross-division foes play each year for the Red Bird Rivalry trophy. BSU has been known as the Cardinals since 1927, while Miami adopted the RedHawks moniker in 1997. The series dates back to 1931 but really heated up in the 1970s when BSU joined the MAC.

Northern Illinois

The Cardinals have played Northern Illinois six times in football since the launch of the Bronze Stalk Trophy. The trophy depicts several cornstalks in tribute to the prevalence of maize around the respective home states of the rivals. Northern Illinois holds a 24–21–2 lead in the series through the 2019 season.

Cardinals in professional football

Ball State has produced a total of 29 NFL draft selections.
The following "Active" and "All-Star" lists account for past and present Ball State University football players that have participated in the National Football League, Canadian Football League, Arena Football League, XFL, United States Football League, European Football League, Austrian Football League, German Football League and IFL.

Active
As of February 2023, there are a total of thirteen Cardinals listed on team rosters in the NFL, CFL, AFL, XFL, IFL, and USFL.

Christian Albright - DL - Saskatchewan Roughriders
Nate Davis - QB - Duke City Gladiators
Walter Fletcher - RB - Montreal Alouettes
Justin Hall - WR - Houston Gamblers
Caleb Huntley - RB - Atlanta Falcons
Hassan Littles - WR - Green Bay Blizzard
Jonathan Newsome - DE - Birmingham Stallions
Antonio Phillips - CB - Vegas Vipers
Danny Pinter - OL - Indianapolis Colts
Drew Plitt - QB - Arlington Renegades
Tuni Ropati - DL - Bay Area Panthers
Willie Snead IV - WR - San Francisco 49ers
Jaylin Thomas - LB - Seattle Sea Dragons

All-stars
Among the numerous Cardinals who have participated in the NFL, CFL, and AFL, three have received all-star recognition by their respective leagues.

Blaine Bishop - S
NFL Pro Bowl (1995, 1996, 1997, 2000)
NFL All-Pro (1995, 1996, 2000)

Timmy Brown - RB
NFL Pro Bowl (1962, 1963, 1965)
NFL All-Pro (1963, 1965, 1966)

Kenny Stucker - K
AFL All-Arena ( & )

Future non-conference opponents 
Announced schedules as of December 27, 2019.

References

 Ball State Historical Data, College Football Data Warehouse.
 Michael Maccambridge (ed.), ESPN College Football Encyclopedia: The Complete History of the Game, ESPN, 2005, .

External links

 

 
American football teams established in 1924
1924 establishments in Indiana